Muniguda railway station is a railway station on the East Coast Railway network in the state of Odisha, India. It serves Muniguda town. Its code is MNGD. It has three platforms. Passenger, Express and Superfast trains halt at Muniguda railway station.

Trains

The following major trains halt at Muniguda railway station in both directions:

 Korba–Visakhapatnam Express
 Visakhapatnam–Lokmanya Tilak Terminus Superfast Express
 Hatia–Bangalore Cantonment Express
 Tatanagar–Yesvantpur Weekly Express
 Rourkela–Jagdalpur Express
 Visakhapatnam–Bhagat Ki Kothi Express
 Dhanbad–Alappuzha Express
 Puri–Ahmedabad Express
 Ratna Express
 Dharti Aaba AC Superfast Express
 Gandhidham–Puri Weekly Express
 Bilaspur–Tirupati Express
 Samata Express
 Sambalpur–Rayagada Intercity Express
 Samaleshwari Express
 Nagavali Express
 Durg–Jagdalpur Express

See also
 Rayagada district

References

Railway stations in Rayagada district
Sambalpur railway division